Variable type may refer to:
Variable star
The data type of a variable within a programming language's type system